Alfred F. "Pots" Clark (November 26, 1900 – September 18, 1973) was an American football player.

A native of Ogden, Utah, Clark played college football for Nevada. He later played professional football in the National Football League (NFL) as a tackle for the Duluth Eskimos and Frankford Yellow Jackets during the 1927 season. He appeared in a total of seven NFL games, four of them as a starter.

References

1900 births
1973 deaths
Sportspeople from Ogden, Utah
Duluth Eskimos players
Frankford Yellow Jackets players
Players of American football from Utah
American football halfbacks
Nevada Wolf Pack football players